Esmailabad (also Romanized as Esmā‘īlābād; also known as Qeshlāq-e Esmā‘īlābād, and Qeshlāq-e Esmā‘īlābād Kūchaklī) is a village in Hakimabad Rural District, in the Central District of Zarandieh County, Markazi Province, Iran. At the 2006 census, its population was 114, in 26 families.

References 

Populated places in Zarandieh County